Devan Jakob Camacho Mendiola is a Guamanian footballer who plays as a midfielder for Rovers FC and the Guam national football team.

International career 
Mendiola appeared in 6 games for Guam and scored 2 goals, including 5 games in the 2022 FIFA World Cup qualification.

International goals

References

1999 births

Guam international footballers

Living people
Guamanian footballers
Association football midfielders